Philip Frank Eliot  (21 December 1835 – 1 November 1917) was an English Anglican clergyman who was Dean of Windsor from 1891 until 1917.

Biography 
Eliot was born at Weymouth, the third son of William Eliot  and his wife, Lydia Ffolliott, sister of John Ffolliott  of Hollybrook House, County Sligo. He was educated at Trinity College, Oxford.

Ordained in 1859, he began his ecclesiastical career with a curacy at St Michael's, Winchester. Following this he was Vicar of Holy Trinity, Bournemouth.

In 1886, he was appointed Canon of the ninth stall at St George's Chapel, Windsor Castle, a position he held until 1891 when he was made Dean of Windsor from 1891 until his death on 1 November 1917.

Family
Eliot was married twice. He married firstly Mary Anna Marriott Smith (1840–1881), daughter of Rev. Francis Smith, rector of Tarrant Rushton, on 1859 at St Mary's Blandford Forum, with issue:

Arthur Francis Eliot (1860–1864), died in childhood
Philip Herbert Eliot (1862–1946), second Bishop of Buckingham
Edith Mary Eliot (1865–19??)
Alice Lydia Gertrude Eliot (1867 – 25 December 1920)
Margaret Fanny Eliot (1868 – 11 June 1953), married Cecil Robert Fryer, brother of Frederick Fryer
Emily Ffolliott Eliot (1871 – 12 July 1926), married Ashley Bickersteth, son of Edward Henry Bickersteth, Bishop of Exeter
Rev. William Francis Eliot (1876 – 7 August 1922), married Katherine Rutherford Devitt, daughter of Sir Thomas Lane Devitt, 1st Baronet
Capt John Alfred Roy Eliot (1877 – 8 May 1955), married Gladys Adelaide Beauchamp Nepean, daughter of Sir Evan Colville Nepean

After Mary Anna's death, he married Hon. Mary Emma Pitt–Rivers (1843–1900), the daughter of George Pitt-Rivers, 4th Baron Rivers, in 1883 Windsor, with issue
Victor Alexander George Eliot (1884–1959)

References

1835 births
People from Weymouth, Dorset
Alumni of Trinity College, Oxford
Knights Commander of the Royal Victorian Order
Canons of Windsor
Deans of Windsor
1917 deaths
Presidents of the Oxford Union